In algebraic K-theory, the K-theory of a category C (usually equipped with some kind of additional data) is a sequence of abelian groups Ki(C) associated to it. If C is an abelian category, there is no need for extra data, but in general it only makes sense to speak of K-theory after specifying on C a structure of an exact category, or of a Waldhausen category, or of a dg-category, or possibly some other variants. Thus, there are several constructions of those groups, corresponding to various kinds of structures put on C. Traditionally, the K-theory of C is defined to be the result of a suitable construction, but in some contexts there are more conceptual definitions. For instance, the K-theory is a 'universal additive invariant' of dg-categories and small stable ∞-categories.

The motivation for this notion comes from algebraic K-theory of rings. For a ring R Daniel Quillen in  introduced two equivalent ways to find the higher K-theory. The  plus construction expresses Ki(R) in terms of R directly, but it's hard to prove properties of the result, including basic ones like functoriality. The other way is to consider the exact category of projective modules over R and to set Ki(R) to be the K-theory of that category, defined using the Q-construction. This approach proved to be more useful, and could be applied to other exact categories as well. Later Friedhelm Waldhausen in  extended the notion of K-theory even further, to very different kinds of categories, including the category of topological spaces.

K-theory of Waldhausen categories
In algebra, the S-construction is a construction in algebraic K-theory that produces a model that can be used to define higher K-groups. It is due to Friedhelm Waldhausen and concerns a category with cofibrations and weak equivalences; such a category is called a Waldhausen category and generalizes Quillen's exact category. A cofibration can be thought of as analogous to a monomorphism, and a category with cofibrations is one in which, roughly speaking, monomorphisms are stable under pushouts. According to Waldhausen, the "S" was chosen to stand for Graeme B. Segal.

Unlike the Q-construction, which produces a topological space, the S-construction produces a simplicial set.

Details 
The arrow category  of a category C is a category whose objects are morphisms in C and whose morphisms are squares in C. Let a finite ordered set  be viewed as a category in the usual way.

The category  defined in this manner is itself a category with cofibrations. One can therefore iterate the construction, forming the sequence. This sequence is a spectrum called the K-theory spectrum of C.

The additivity theorem
Most basic properties of algebraic K-theory of categories are consequences of the following important theorem. There are versions of it in all available settings. Here's a statement for Waldhausen categories. Notably, it's used to show that the sequence of spaces obtained by the iterated S-construction is an  Ω-spectrum. 

Let C be a Waldhausen category. The additivity theorem says that the induced map on K-theory spaces  is a homotopy equivalence.

For  dg-categories the statement is similar. Let C be a small pretriangulated dg-category with a semiorthogonal decomposition . Then the map of K-theory spectra K(C) → K(C1) ⊕ K(C2) is a homotopy equivalence. In fact, K-theory is a universal functor satisfying this additivity property and  Morita invariance.

Category of finite sets

Consider the category of pointed finite sets.  This category has an object  for every natural number k, and the morphisms in this category are the functions  which preserve the zero element.  A theorem of Barratt, Priddy and Quillen says that the algebraic K-theory of this category is a sphere spectrum.

Miscellaneous

More generally in abstract category theory, the K-theory of a category is a type of decategorification in which a set is created from an equivalence class of objects in a stable (∞,1)-category, where the elements of the set inherit an Abelian group structure from the exact sequences in the category.

Group completion method 
The Grothendieck group construction is a functor from the category of rings to the category of abelian groups. The higher K-theory should then be a functor from the category of rings but to the category of higher objects such as simplicial abelian groups.

Topological Hochschild homology 
Waldhausen introduced the idea of a trace map from the algebraic K-theory of a ring to its Hochschild homology; by way of this map, information can be obtained about the K-theory from the Hochschild homology. Bökstedt factorized this trace map, leading to the idea of a functor known as the topological Hochschild homology of the ring's Eilenberg–MacLane spectrum.

K-theory of a simplicial ring 
If R is a constant simplicial ring, then this is the same thing as K-theory of a ring.

See also 
Volodin space
Cotriple homology

Notes

References

Further reading
 
For the recent ∞-category approach, see

Category theory
K-theory